Seanad Éireann (Senate of Ireland) was the upper house of the Oireachtas (parliament) of the Irish Free State from 1922 to 1936. It has also been known simply as the Senate, First Seanad, Free State Senate or Free State Seanad. The Senate was established under the 1922 Constitution of the Irish Free State but a number of constitutional amendments were subsequently made to change the manner of its election and its powers. It was eventually abolished in 1936 when it attempted to obstruct constitutional reforms favoured by the government. It sat, like its modern successor, in Leinster House.

Powers
The Free State Senate was subordinate to Dáil Éireann (the lower house) and could delay but not veto decisions of that house. Nonetheless, the Free State Senate had more power than its successor, the modern Seanad Éireann, which can only delay normal legislation for 90 days. As originally adopted the constitution provided that the Free State Senate had power to delay a money bill for 21 days (three weeks) and delay any other bill for 270 days (approximately nine months)—with the potential for a further 9 months' delay if the Seanad voted to suspend a bill just passed into law in order to initiate a referendum on it. In 1928, this second period was extended so that the Senate could delay a non-money bill for 20 months.

Composition and election
The 1922 Constitution provided for a Senate of 60 members directly elected. Members would serve 12-year terms, with one quarter of the house elected every three years. The members would be elected under the system of proportional representation by means of the single transferable vote in a single, nationwide, 15-seat constituency.

However, to get the house started, the body's initial membership would be appointed by Dáil Éireann (the lower house) and the President of the Executive Council. To complicate matters even more, after the holding of the first direct election, the constitution was amended, so that the final three elections to the Senate occurred by a method of indirect election. Therefore, in the five elections to the Senate to occur before its abolition, three different systems were used.

It was originally required that membership of the Senate be limited to those who were over 35. Constitutional amendments made in 1928 reduced the minimum age to 30 and the term of office from 12 years to 9 years.

Today incarnations of the modern Seanad Éireann are given a new number after each senatorial election. Thus, the current Senate elected in 2016 is known as the 'Twenty-Fifth Seanad'. This was not the custom during the Irish Free State because the Free State Senate was elected in stages and thus considered to be in permanent session. However, as a gesture of continuity with its Free State predecessor, the first Senate elected after 1937 is numbered as the "Second Seanad". The Free State Senate, despite the occurrence of three senatorial elections before its abolition, is considered to have been a single Seanad for the duration of its existence and is thus referred for that whole period as the "First Seanad".

1922 election

Half the initial membership of the Senate were appointed by the President of the Executive Council (prime minister), W. T. Cosgrave; the other half were elected by the Dáil under the single transferable vote. The first 15 elected by the Dáil were assigned a term of nine years, the other 15 a term of three years. Cosgrave's nominees were divided by lot, 15 to serve for twelve years and 15 for six years. The President agreed to use his appointments in 1922 to grant extra representation to the Protestant minority in the state, most of whom were former Southern Unionists, to promote inclusiveness in the new Free State.

As a result, of the sixty members of the first Senate, as well as 36 Catholics, there were 20 Protestants, 3 Quakers and 1 Jew. It contained 7 peers, a dowager countess (Ellen, Countess of Desart, who was Jewish), 5 baronets and several knights. The New York Times remarked that the first senate was "representative of all classes", though it has also been described as, "the most curious political grouping in the history of the Irish state". Members included W. B. Yeats, Oliver St. John Gogarty, General Sir Bryan Mahon and Jennie Wyse Power.

Also included was the Earl of Kerry, heir to the 5th Marquess of Lansdowne. Lord Kerry succeeded his father in the peerage in June 1927, thus becoming the 6th Marquess of Lansdowne in his own right. This gave the new Lord Lansdowne an hereditary seat in the British House of Lords. Thus he had the unique distinction for a time of being a member of both the Oireachtas in Dublin and the British Parliament at Westminster.

The opponents of the Anglo-Irish Treaty also opposed the new Senate, and 37 of the senators' homes were burnt to the ground. Others were intimidated, kidnapped or almost assassinated. Nevertheless, the first Senate greatly influenced the guiding principles and legislative foundations of the new state.

The first Chairman was Lord Glenavy. Lord Glenavy had formerly served as the Lord Chief Justice of Ireland from 1916 to 1918 and had served as Lord Chancellor of Ireland from 1918 to 1921.

George Sigerson served as chairman briefly from 11 to 12 December 1922 before the election of Lord Glenavy.

1925 election

The 15 original 3-year seats came up for election in 1925, as did four other seats which had been filled temporarily by co-option. The 19 retiring members were automatically eligible for re-election; another 19 candidates were nominated by the Senate (by the single transferable vote from a list of 29); the Dáil nominated 38 candidates (from a list of 57, again by the single transferable vote). The 76 candidates were then put to the public electorate on 17 September 1925, but without partisan campaigning, turnout was less than a quarter of the 1,345,000 potential voters. The count took two weeks. Only 8 of the former senators were re-elected, with particularly poor results for the Gaelic League and Douglas Hyde.

Subsequent elections
After the amendment of the constitution in 1928, future members of the Senate were to be elected from a single constituency consisting of the combined membership of the outgoing senate and the Dáil, and the system was changed so that a third (20 seats) rather than a quarter (15 seats) of the Senate would be replaced at each election. The elections were still held by secret ballot and under the single transferable vote. Elections took place under the new system in 1928, 1931, and 1934 before the Senate was abolished in 1936.

The system for nominating candidates was also changed. After 1928, it was provided that the number of nominees would be equal to twice the number of seats to be filled and that half would be elected by the Dáil and the other half by the Senate. Both houses used the single transferable vote for this purpose. The right of outgoing senators to nominate themselves was removed.

By-elections
The constitution originally provided that premature vacancies would be filled by a vote of the Senate. However, a candidate elected in this way would serve only until the next senatorial election, when the seat would come up for election along with the others scheduled to be filled. In 1929, the system was changed so that vacancies were filled by members of both houses voting together.

Abolition

The Free State Senate was abolished entirely by the Constitution (Amendment No. 24) Act 1936 after it delayed some Government proposals for constitutional changes. Éamon de Valera had seen its delay of his proposals as illegitimate, although the continuing opposition majority had been a result of his own earlier boycott of the Free State Oireachtas (combined with the provision for the Senate's self-election). The abolition was highly controversial at the time and the last chairman Thomas Westropp Bennett played a key role. It opposed its own abolition, but this decision was over-ridden by the Dáil. De Valera later created a new Senate in the 1937 Constitution of Ireland.

Direct democracy role
As adopted the Free State constitution contained a number of provisions for direct democracy, which included a special role for the Senate. Most importantly it was provided that the Senate could, if three fifths of its members agreed, demand a binding referendum on any bill. This was to allow the Senate to appeal to voters directly if there was a disagreement between the two houses and if the Dáil attempted to override the Senate. However, this power was taken from the Senate in 1928 before it had been put into use. It was in compensation for this loss that the Senate's powers of delay were increased in the same year.

Before it was removed, the Senate's right to demand a referendum was contained in Article 47, which provided for voters to veto legislation directly in certain circumstances. The article provided that once a bill had been approved by both houses of the Oireachtas (or just by the Dáil, if it had over-ridden the Senate), its enactment into law could be suspended if, within seven days, either a majority of the Senate or three fifths of all members of the Dáil so requested.

There would then be a further period of ninety days within which either 5% of all registered voters or 60% of the Senate could demand a referendum on the bill. The referendum would be decided by a majority of votes cast and if rejected the bill would not become law. Article 47 did not apply to money bills or bills declared by both houses to be "necessary for the immediate preservation of the public peace, health or safety". In 1928, Article 47 was repealed in its entirety, along with Article 48 which provided for an initiative process.

A similar power given to the Free State Seanad by Article 47 is granted to the modern Irish Senate by the 1937 Constitution of Ireland. Under the current constitution, a simple majority of senators (with the agreement of one-third of the Dáil) can request that the President of Ireland refer a bill to the people. The President can thus refuse to sign it until it has been approved either in an ordinary referendum or by the Dáil after it has reassembled after a general election. This power has never been used because the modern Senate is designed in such a way as to have a permanent government majority.

List of constitutional amendments
During the Irish Free State there were at least 12 constitutional amendments relating to the Senate:

The Senate was replaced by the modern Senate, Seanad Éireann, established by the Constitution of Ireland in 1937. This new Seanad was considered to be the direct successor of the Free State Seanad.

Notable members

Thomas Westropp Bennett
Kathleen Browne
Kathleen Clarke
Eileen Costello
Ellen Cuffe, Countess of Desart
Sir Thomas Esmonde, 11th Baronet
James Campbell, 1st Baron Glenavy
Oliver St. John Gogarty
Alice Stopford Green
Henry Guinness
Sir William Hickie
Douglas Hyde
Thomas Johnson
Henry Petty-Fitzmaurice, 6th Marquess of Lansdowne
Edward MacLysaght
Sir Bryan Mahon
Maurice George Moore
Sir Horace Plunkett
George Sigerson
Jennie Wyse Power
Windham Wyndham-Quin, 4th Earl of Dunraven and Mount-Earl
W. B. Yeats

See also
History of the Republic of Ireland
Parliament of Southern Ireland
Seanad Éireann, the modern Irish Senate
Senate
:Category:Members of Seanad Éireann by term

Footnotes

References

Sources

Citations

External links
Official list of members of the 1922 Seanad
Bruce-Andrew Finch, Birthpangs of a new nation: Thomas Westropp Bennett and the Irish Free State

Government in the Irish Free State
Defunct upper houses
 
1922 establishments in Ireland
1936 disestablishments in Ireland